Agubedia is a village in the Tkvarcheli District of Abkhazia, a partially-recognized state but nominally part of Georgia.

References

Populated places in Tkvarcheli District